The American Journal of Enology and Viticulture (AJEV) is the official journal of the American Society for Enology and Viticulture (ASEV) and is dedicated to scientific research on winemaking and grapegrowing. AJEV is a hybrid, online-based journal that publishes text or video-based research reports, reviews, insights, technical reports, and letters that span the disciplines of enology and viticulture and related fields such as biochemistry, biocontrol, chemistry, ecology, economics, engineering, management sociology, microbiology, pest management, plant biology, plant genetics, plant pathology, plant physiology, sensory and consumer sciences, soil science, waste management, and other applicable areas. All contributions are peer reviewed, and authorship is not limited to members of ASEV. AJEV is published on a continuous basis, as contributions are accepted. Open-access contributions are published under a Creative Commons Attribution (CC BY) license. The science editor, along with the viticulture, enology, and associate editors, are drawn from academic and research institutions worldwide and guide the content of AJEV. According to the Journal Citation Reports by Thomson Reuters, AJEV has a 2021 impact factor of 2.63.

AJEV was first published in 1950 as a single proceedings volume by the American Society of Enologists, founded by a group of University of California researchers and California winemakers, with further yearly proceedings published in 1951 to 1953. In 1954, the first issue of the American Journal of Enology was published and in 1955, quarterly publication began. The Journal was renamed the American Journal of Enology and Viticulture in 1966. The Society was renamed the American Society for Enology and Viticulture in 1984.

External links 
 

Publications established in 1950
English-language journals
Quarterly journals
Agricultural journals
1950 establishments in the United States
Academic journals published by learned and professional societies of the United States